Anel Dedić (born 2 May 1991) is a Bosnian professional footballer who plays as a midfielder for Bosnian Premier League club Mladost Doboj Kakanj.

Career

Early career
In the 2012–13 season, Dedić was named "League's Player of the Season" of First League of FBiH. During the season he scored 9 goals.

Dedić made his top flight debut for Vitez under Valentin Plavčić management on 27 July 2013, in a league match against Travnik where he scored his team's only goal. He managed to win a place in the starting lineup, as he concluded the 2013–14 season with 24 matches and 4 goals.

After Vitez, Dedić spent two years playing at Čelik Zenica from 2014 to 2016. In 2016 he came back to Vitez, where he stayed until 2017.

Teuta Durrës
On 15 July 2017, Dedić moved for the first time aboard by joining Albanian Superliga club Teuta Durrës on a one-year contract. Then he flew in Italy to join the team during their summer preparation phase. He took squad number 8, and made his first Albanian Superliga appearance on 9 September 2017, in matchday 1 against Luftëtari Gjirokastër. Dedić received a straight red card during the matchday 5 tie against Partizani Tirana for hitting Renaldo Kalari with his elbow. He was suspended an initial 5 matches by Disciplinary Commission, which was later reduced to only 2, which created many controversies.

His first score-sheet contributions came in his seventh appearance where he opened the score with a header in an eventual 1–2 defeat against Lushnja. Later on 15 November, Dedić scored a brace, including one free-kick and one penalty, as Teuta won against Luftëtari Gjirokastër to return to winning ways in the league after seven matches. It was the third consecutive match that he had scored, which earned manager Gugash Magani praise, who went on to say: "Dedić is a key player of the team."

Dedić was injured in January 2018, returning to the team only in mid-February, appearing as substitute in the 0–2 loss against fellow relegation strugglers Vllaznia Shkodër. Later on 19 March, he netted a last-minute winner with a free-kick in the 3–2 away win over bottom-side Lushnja to give Teuta three vital points, and the first win since November 2017, in their bid to escape relegation. Dedić finished the 2017–18 season by playing 29 league matches and scoring 7 goals, as Teuta was able to retain their top flight spot after a strong run in the last matches. He also played two cup games as the team was knocked-out in the quarter-finals. He left the club after his contract run out and the board decided not to offer him a renew.

Return to Čelik
On 14 June 2018, after two years, Dedić came back to Čelik and signed a two year contract. He made his debut and scored his first goal for Čelik on 21 July 2018, in a 3–1 away loss against Krupa.

On 9 March 2019, in a 3–1 home win against GOŠK Gabela, Dedić scored two goals in that game for Čelik in the 58th and 61st minute. He was left go by the club on 21 January 2020.

Mladost Doboj Kakanj
Shortly after leaving Čelik, Dedić signed a two-and-a-half-year contract with Mladost Doboj Kakanj on 27 January 2020. He made his official debut for Mladost in a 3–2 home loss against Široki Brijeg on 29 February 2020. Dedić scored his first goal for Mladost in a league match against Tuzla City on 15 August 2020.

Style of play
Apart from his natural midfielder position, Dedić can also be deployed as playmaker or false attacking midfielder.

Career statistics

Club

Honours
Vitez
First League FBiH: 2012–13

Individual
Awards 
First League FBiH Player of the Season: 2012–13

Notes

References

External links

1991 births
Living people
Sportspeople from Zenica
Bosniaks of Bosnia and Herzegovina
Association football midfielders
Bosnia and Herzegovina footballers
NK Vitez players
NK Čelik Zenica players
KF Teuta Durrës players
FK Mladost Doboj Kakanj players
First League of the Federation of Bosnia and Herzegovina players
Premier League of Bosnia and Herzegovina players
Kategoria Superiore players
Bosnia and Herzegovina expatriate footballers
Expatriate footballers in Albania 
Bosnia and Herzegovina expatriate sportspeople in Albania